Wilmar Jordán Gil (born 17 October 1990) is a Colombian professional footballer who plays as a striker for Indian Super League club NorthEast United.

Career
Jordán started his senior career with Monagas in Venezuela. He made 35 appearances during the 2010–11 season in the Venezuelan Primera División finishing as the club's top scorer with 20 goals.

On 1 July 2011, Jordán joined Gyeongnam FC in South Korea. On 16 July, he marked his K League debut with a goal in a 7–1 victory over Daejeon Citizen. On 16 October, Jordán scored a brace as Gyeongnam beat Daegu 3–0.

In the summer of 2013 Jordán signed with Bulgarian side Litex Lovech. On 14 December 2013, he scored his first hat-trick for the team, in a 5–2 away league win over Lokomotiv Plovdiv. Jordán finished his first season in Bulgaria as leading A PFG goalscorer with 20 goals, together with Martin Kamburov.

On 27 February 2015, he joined Chinese Super League club Tianjin Teda.

On 18 August 2015, he joined U.A.E side Emirates Club on loan. Jordán scored a hat trick in a 4-3 win against Al Dhafra.

In May 2017, Jordán became part of the ranks of Portuguese club Chaves.

Atlético Huila
In early 2019, he signed a contract with Colombian side Atlético Huila.

NorthEast United
In November 2022, Jordán signed for Indian Super League club NorthEast United.

Career statistics

Club

Honours

Individual
Bulgarian A Football Group – Top scorer: 2013–14 (20 goals)

References

External links

 
 
 
 

1990 births
Living people
Footballers from Medellín
Association football forwards
Colombian footballers
Monagas S.C. players
Gyeongnam FC players
Seongnam FC players
PFC Litex Lovech players
Tianjin Jinmen Tiger F.C. players
Emirates Club players
PFC CSKA Sofia players
G.D. Chaves players
NorthEast United FC players
Chinese Super League players
K League 1 players
First Professional Football League (Bulgaria) players
Primeira Liga players
Categoría Primera A players
UAE Pro League players
Venezuelan Primera División players
Indian Super League players
Colombian expatriate footballers
Expatriate footballers in Venezuela
Colombian expatriate sportspeople in Venezuela
Expatriate footballers in South Korea
Colombian expatriate sportspeople in South Korea
Expatriate footballers in Bulgaria
Colombian expatriate sportspeople in Bulgaria
Expatriate footballers in China
Colombian expatriate sportspeople in China
Expatriate footballers in the United Arab Emirates
Colombian expatriate sportspeople in the United Arab Emirates
Expatriate footballers in Portugal
Colombian expatriate sportspeople in Portugal
Expatriate footballers in Brazil
Colombian expatriate sportspeople in Brazil
Expatriate footballers in India
Colombian expatriate sportspeople in India